7A or VII-A may refer to :

Law, legal system
 Housing (apartment, rent, landlord, tenant)
 Article 7A (NYC housing code), an alternative to rent strikes / to expedite repair
 Labor law
 Los Angeles Garment Workers strike of 1933, National Industrial Recovery Act (NIRA), section 7A, "living wages"
 taxes
 Rates in Hong Kong, a property tax system known as "rates": Section 7A(2), (3)

Transportation, navigation
 7A (Long Island bus)
 Air Next IATA airline designator
 British Columbia Highway 7A
 Massachusetts Route 7A
 Vermont Route 7A

Other
 Division 7A dividend, an amount treated by the Australian Tax Office as an assessable dividend of a shareholder of a private company
 Oflag VII-A Murnau, a German prisoner of war camp
 Stalag VII-A, a German prisoner of war camp
 7A, the production code for the 1986 Doctor Who serial The Mysterious Planet

See also
A7 (disambiguation)